John Bayley (17 May 1794 – 7 November 1874) was an English professional cricketer who played first-class cricket from 1822 to 1850.  He was mainly associated with Surrey and was a member of the county team when Surrey County Cricket Club was founded in 1845.  Bayley was employed by Marylebone Cricket Club (MCC) on its ground staff from 1832 to 1850 and played for the MCC team.  He also played for Hampshire and Middlesex.

Bayley was a right-handed batsman  and a slow roundarm bowler.  He was in addition an occasional wicket-keeper.  He made 83 known appearances in first-class cricket, including matches for The Bs (1822 to 1837), the South (1836) and the Players (1836).

References

1794 births
1874 deaths
English cricketers
English cricketers of 1787 to 1825
English cricketers of 1826 to 1863
Marylebone Cricket Club cricketers
Hampshire cricketers
Middlesex cricketers
Surrey cricketers
Players cricketers
North v South cricketers
Surrey Club cricketers
The Bs cricketers
E. H. Budd's XI cricketers
Old Wykehamists cricketers
Fast v Slow cricketers
William Ward's XI cricketers
Non-international England cricketers
Marylebone Cricket Club First 8 with 3 Others cricketers
Lord Strathavon's XI cricketers